Delusions is the fourth studio album recorded by American female vocal trio First Choice, released in 1977 on the Gold Mind label.

History
The album features the song "Doctor Love", which peaked at No. 41 on the Billboard Hot 100 and No. 23 on the Hot Soul Singles chart. Another single, "Love Having You Around", had moderate success on the charts. The album was remastered and reissued with bonus tracks in 2012 by Big Break Records.

Track listing

Personnel
Rochelle Fleming, Annette Guest, Ursula Herring – vocals
Earl Young, Keith Benson – drums
Ronnie Baker, Michael "Sugarbear" Foreman, Jim Williams – bass
Norman Harris, T.J. Tindall, Bobby Eli, Ken Dockins – guitars
Ron Kersey, Carlton "Cotton" Kent, Bruce Hawes, Bruce Gray – keyboards
Larry Washington, Jesse Harris – congas and bongos
Vincent Montana, Jr. – vibes
Ron Kersey, Bruce Hawes – synthesizer
Don Renaldo (Charles Apollonia, Rudolph Malizia, Lance Elbeck, Christine Reeves, Richard Jones) – violins
Anthony Sinagoga, Davis Barnett – violas
Romeo Di Stefano – cello
Richard Genovese, Roger De Lillo, Fred Joiner – trombones
Rocco Bene, Robert Hartzell – trumpets and flugelhorns 
Jack Faith – flute
Joe De Angelis, Milton Phibbs – French horns
Leno Zachery – alto saxophone
John H. Davis – baritone saxophone

Charts

Singles

References

External links
 

1977 albums
First Choice (band) albums
Albums produced by Norman Harris
Albums recorded at Sigma Sound Studios
Gold Mind Records albums